Cyclononene is a cycloalkene with a nine-membered ring, with two possible geometric isomers, denoted cis-cyclononene and trans-cyclononene, or (Z)-cyclononene and (E)-cyclononene.

References

Cycloalkenes
Nine-membered rings